Kanyasulkam is a 1955 Indian Telugu-language philosophical film directed by P. Pullaiah and produced by D. L. Narayana for his production company Vinodha Pictures. The film stars N. T. Rama Rao, Savitri and Sowcar Janaki, with soundtrack and score by Ghantasala. N. Prakash and R. Hanumantha Rao served as the cinematographer and editor respectively. This film marked the screen debut of actress, Urvashi Sharada who made a cameo appearance for a three-minute song sequence as a child artist- the latter later making her acting debut (six years later) with the Telugu film, Iddaru Mitrulu (1961) and it had starred opposite Akkineni Nageswara Rao & E. V. Saroja in the leading roles. Written by Vempati Sadasivabrahmam, Kanyasulkam is based on a play of the same name by Gurajada Apparao, and is set during the Pre-Independence era in the Vizianagaram area of the Madras Presidency of British India. The film focuses on a group of Brahmin caste individuals and their attempts to earn easy money by conning the women around them, including a young widow and a nine-year-old bride. Principal photography was conducted in sets erected at Narasu, Revathi and Venus Cine Studios in Kodambakkam, Madras (now Chennai). The post-production activities were completed at Vijaya Laboratory Film Centre Pvt. Ltd. in Madras. Kanyasulkam was released theatrically on 26 August 1955 and opened to negative reviews from both the critics and the audience, who criticized the changes made to the play while adapting it to film. During its later re-released in 1983, 1986 and 1993 limitedly across Andhra Pradesh, Kanyasulkam completed a 100-day run every time, making it the only Indian film to do so.

Plot 
The film is set during the Pre-Independence era in the Vizianagaram area of the Madras Presidency of British India. Gireesham, an educated conman, lives at the expense of Putakoollamma who runs a mess. He befriends a prostitute Madhuravani, to whom Ramappa Panthulu of Ramachandrapuram is attracted to. Ramappa Panthulu is an unmarried miser who is well known among the Brahmin community in Ramachandrapuram. In an attempt to earn good money, Ramappa Panthulu encourages a 60-year old man named Lubdhavadhanulu to remarry and suggests alliance with Agnihotravadhanulu of Krishnarayapuram. Agnihotravadhanulu agrees to perform the marriage of his nine-year-old daughter Subbamma to Lubdhavadhanulu, despite pleas from his wife Venkamma, so that he can grab money as dowry.

Agnihotravadhanulu's son Venkatesam returns to home with Gireesham, who happens to be his English teacher. With his wits, Gireesham manages to win the trust of everyone in Agnihotravadhanulu's house, including that of his widowed daughter Buchamma. As time passes, Gireesham begins to desire for Buchamma and schemes to marry her. Meanwhile, Venkamma watches a play of Gurajada Apparao's "Poornamma". Moved by the end where a minor bride commits suicide unable to accept her marriage with an old man, Venkamma attempts suicide. Gireesham saves her, which makes Venkamma's brother Karataka Sastry vow to end this unjust alliance at any cost.

Being a stage actor, Karataka Sastry takes the help of Madhuravani and attempts to "stage" a play: he makes his disciple Mahesham wear the disguise of a girl, and conducts the marriage with Lubdhavadhanulu. When Lubdhavadhanulu learns the truth, he feels remorseful for his deeds and apologises. Meanwhile, Gireesham elopes with Buchamma to Visakhapatnam and meets Soujanya Rao, a lawyer with progressive ideals. Madhuravani notices his absence and leads the family to Soujanya Rao's office and tells him the truth. Soujanya Rao chastises Gireesham and conducts his marriage with Buchamma after he realises the error of his ways.

Cast 
 N. T. Rama Rao as Gireesham
 Savitri as Madhuravani
 Sowcar Janaki as Buchamma
 C. S. R. Anjaneyulu as Ramappa Pantulu
 Govindarajula Subba Rao as Lubdhavadhanlu
 Gummadi as Sowjanya Rao
 Vinnakota Ramanna Panthulu as  Agnihotravadhanlu
 Vangara Venkata Subbaiah as Karataka Sastri
 Suryakantham as Meenakshi
 Chaya Devi as Putakoollamma
 Hemalatha as Venkamma
 Chadalavada Kutumba Rao as Polishetty
 Master Sudhakar as Mahesam
 Master Kundu as Venkatesam
 Baby Subhadra as Subbi
 Peketi Sivaram as Police Constable (cameo appearance)
 Sharada in a cameo appearance for the song "Bommala Pelli"

Production 
During the production of Devadasu (1953), producer D. L. Narayana approached N. T. Rama Rao for playing the titular role. Rama Rao could not accept the proposal due to scheduling conflicts, and Akkineni Nageswara Rao was cast for the same. However, Narayana was adamant to make a film with Rama Rao, and chose to adapt Gurajada Apparao play Kanyasulkam. Due to the play's popularity, Narayana asked writer Vempati Sadasivabrahmam to make changes to the narrative and plot points from the play, with a view to avoid predictability.

Narayana produced the film for his production company Vinodha Pictures, and signed P. Pullaiah to direct it. R. Hanumantha Rao, who was the film's assistant director, also served as the editor. Sadasivabrahmam also worked on the screenplay and dialogue apart from adapting the play into a script. He also adapted the poem "Poornamma", which is a part of Apparao's poetry compilation Mutyala Saralu, into one of the subplots to ease the audience into the milieu. N. Prakash served as the cinematographer assisted by Jaihind Satyam and R. N. Nagaraja Rao.

Rama Rao played Gireesham, the anti-heroic protagonist of the play whose character arc was altered in the end as part of the scripting changes. Savitri was cast as Madhuravani, a prostitute and the other protagonist of the play. Narayana approached Jamuna to play Buchamma, but her father opposed this idea unwilling to see her act as a young widow on screen. Sowcar Janaki was later cast for the same. C. S. R. Anjaneyulu, Govindarajula Subba Rao, Vinnakota Ramanna Panthulu and Gummadi were cast in other supporting roles. Peketi Sivaram and Sharada made cameo appearances in the film.

Pasumarthi Krishnamurthy choreographed the dance sequences. Godagankar and Vali were signed as the art directors, and were aided by Haribabu and K. Nageswara Rao in the production design. Sets were erected at Narasu, Revathi and Venus Cine Studios in Kodambakkam, Madras (now Chennai) where majority of the principal photography was wrapped up. The post production activities were completed at Vijaya Laboratory Film Centre Pvt. Ltd. in Madras.

Music 

Ghantasala composed the film's soundtrack and score. K. Ramachandran, T. S. Ranga Saamy, N. Seshadri and Suryanarayana worked on the sound design and audiography. Apart from songs with lyrics written by Devulapalli Krishnasastri, Malladi Venkata Krishna Murthy, Samudrala Sr., and Sadasivabrahmam exclusively for the film, Narayana and Pullaiah decided to use Sri Sri "Anandam Aarnavamaithe" and Basavaraju Apparao's "Nagula Chavithi" were utilised in the soundtrack. The soundtrack, marketed by HMV Records, was released on 1 January 1955.

Release and reception 
Kanyasulkam was released theatrically on 26 August 1955 and opened to negative reviews from both the critics and the audience, particularly from those who admired the play. The word of mouth was influenced heavily by those who felt that the redemption of Gireesham at the end was a major undoing to Apparao's vision. In his review for the Zamin Ryot magazine dated 2 September 1955, Anantha Padmanabha Rao criticised the film's writing and the performances of Rama Rao and Janaki. However, he praised Savitri's performance calling it "commendable". The film managed to complete a 56-day run with average returns until the release of Rama Rao's Jayasimha, whose commercial success shadowed Kanyasulkam completely. Kanyasulkam was later re-released in 1983, 1986 and 1993 limitedly across Andhra Pradesh and completed a 100-day run every time, making it the only Indian film to do so.

References

External links 
 

1950s Telugu-language films
1955 films
Films directed by P. Pullayya
Films scored by Ghantasala (musician)
Indian films based on plays
Indian drama films
1955 drama films